Solon Township is a civil township of Kent County in the U.S. state of Michigan. The population was 5,974 at the 2010 census, a large increase from 4,662 at the 2000 census.

Geography

Major highways
  runs north briefly through the southeast corner of the township.
  runs west–east through the southern portion of the township before running concurrent with U.S. Route 131.

Demographics
As of the census of 2000, there were 4,662 people, 1,682 households, and 1,310 families residing in the township. The racial makeup of the township was 96.31% White, 0.26% African American, 1.16% Native American, 0.28% Asian, 0.60% from other races, and 1.39% from two or more races. Hispanic or Latino of any race were 1.74% of the population.

There were 1,682 households, out of which 38.5% had children under the age of 18 living with them, 65.4% were married couples living together, 8.0% had a female householder with no husband present, and 22.1% were non-families. 18.5% of all households were made up of individuals, and 6.3% had someone living alone who was 65 years of age or older.  The average household size was 2.77 and the average family size was 3.14.

In the township the population was spread out, with 28.8% under the age of 18, 7.6% from 18 to 24, 31.5% from 25 to 44, 22.3% from 45 to 64, and 9.8% who were 65 years of age or older.  The median age was 35 years. For every 100 females, there were 101.8 males.  For every 100 females age 18 and over, there were 102.5 males.

The median income for a household in the township was $44,814, and the median income for a family was $50,439. Males had a median income of $36,736 versus $27,451 for females. The per capita income for the township was $17,540.  About 2.5% of families and 5.1% of the population were below the poverty line, including 4.6% of those under age 18 and 2.2% of those age 65 or over.

Education
Nelson Township is served by four separate school districts.  The majority of the township is served by Cedar Springs Public Schools.  Portions of the western side of the township are served by Kent City Community Schools.  A very small portion of the northeast corner of the township is served by Tri County Area Schools, and another very small portion of the northwest portion of the township is served by Grant Public School District to the north in Newaygo County.

Notable people
Mary Welch, 10-month old infant murdered by her parents

References

External links
Solon Township official website

Townships in Michigan
Townships in Kent County, Michigan
Grand Rapids metropolitan area
Populated places established in 1857
1857 establishments in Michigan